Kells United F.C. was an English association football club.

History
They reached the 1st round of the FA Cup in 1935, losing 0–4 to Stalybridge Celtic.

Records
Best FA Cup performance: 1st Round, 1935–36

References

Defunct football clubs in England
Defunct football clubs in Cumbria